The Government of Uttarakhand also known as the State Government of Uttarakhand, or locally as State Government, is the subnational government  of the Indian state of Uttarakhand and its 13 Districts. It consists of an executive branch, led by the Governor of Uttarakhand, a legislative branch led by the Chief Minister of Uttarakhand and a judiciary branch, led by the Chief Justice of Uttarakhand.

Like other states in India, the head of state of Uttarakhand is the Governor, appointed by the President of India on the advice of the Union Government of India. His or her post is largely ceremonial. The Chief Minister is the head of government and is vested with most of the executive powers. Currently Bhararisain is the summer and Dehradun is the winter capital of Uttarakhand, and houses the Vidhan Sabha (Legislative Assembly) and the Secretariat in each capital. The Uttarakhand High Court, located in Nainital exercises jurisdiction over the whole state.

The present unicameral legislature of Uttarakhand is the Legislative Assembly of Uttarakhand. It comprises 70 Members of the Legislative Assembly (MLAs).

See also
Uttarakhand Legislative Assembly
Speaker of the Uttarakhand Legislative Assembly
Leader of the Opposition in the Uttarakhand Legislative Assembly
Cabinet of Uttarakhand
State governments of India

References

External links
 Official website

 
2000 establishments in Uttarakhand